Víctor Patíñez (born 8 November 1949) is a Venezuelan sprinter. He competed in the men's 4 × 400 metres relay at the 1968 Summer Olympics.

References

External links
 

1949 births
Living people
Athletes (track and field) at the 1968 Summer Olympics
Venezuelan male sprinters
Olympic athletes of Venezuela
Place of birth missing (living people)
Central American and Caribbean Games medalists in athletics
20th-century Venezuelan people
21st-century Venezuelan people